This was the third edition of the tournament as an ATP Challenger Tour event and the first edition since 2012.

Guido Andreozzi and Guillermo Durán won the title leading 5–1 in the final after Felipe Meligeni Alves and João Lucas Reis da Silva retired.

Seeds

Draw

References

External links
 Main draw

São Léo Open - Doubles
2022 Doubles